Silas Alward (April 14, 1841 – June 12, 1919) was a Canadian politician in the province of New Brunswick.

Born in New Canaan, Queens County, New Brunswick, the son of John Alward and Mary A. Corey, Alward received a Bachelor of Arts degree from Acadia College in Wolfville, Nova Scotia, in 1860. In 1871, he received an A.M. degree from Brown University in Providence, Rhode Island. He studied law in Saint John, New Brunswick, and was called to the bar of New Brunswick in 1866.

He was elected by acclamation to the Legislative Assembly of New Brunswick in 1887. A Liberal, he was re-elected in the 1890, 1892, and 1895 elections but was defeated in the 1899 election.

References

External links
 

1841 births
1919 deaths
Brown University alumni
New Brunswick Liberal Association MLAs